Thomas Ingoldsthorpe (or Thomas of Ingoldisthorpe) was a medieval Bishop of Rochester.

Ingoldsthorpe was from Ingoldisthorpe in Norfolk. He held the offices of Archdeacon of Sudbury in the diocese of Norwich, then was Archdeacon of Middlesex in the diocese of London. He was named Dean of St Paul's on 9 March 1277.

Ingoldsthorpe was elected about 9 July 1283 and consecrated on 26 September 1283 or 3 October 1283. He died on 11 May 1291.

Citations

References
 British History Online Archdeacons of Middlesex accessed on 30 October 2007
 British History Online Bishops of Rochester accessed on 30 October 2007
 British History Online Deans of St Paul's accessed on 30 October 2007
 

Bishops of Rochester
People from Ingoldisthorpe
13th-century English Roman Catholic bishops
Deans of St Paul's
1291 deaths
Year of birth unknown
Archdeacons of Sudbury